Peter Kelly is a Gaelic footballer from County Kildare. He plays for the Kildare senior inter county football team and for his club Two Mile House.

In October 2010, Kelly was named in the 2010 All Stars Award football team for his performances for Kildare during the 2010 season; it was his first All Stars Award in his first season.

References

Year of birth missing (living people)
Living people
Kildare inter-county Gaelic footballers